A Royal Scandal, also known as Czarina, is a 1945 American comedy-drama film directed by Otto Preminger, produced by Ernst Lubitsch. about the lovelife of Russian empress Catherine the Great. It stars Tallulah Bankhead, Charles Coburn, Anne Baxter and William Eythe. The film was based on the play Die Zarin (The Czarina) by Lajos Bíró and Melchior Lengyel.

Plot
The palace of the demanding and iron-fisted Russian czarina Catherine the Great is full of intrigue. Devoted chancellor Nicolai Ilyitch conducts delicate negotiations for a treaty with France while surreptitiously stealing from the imperial treasuries. General Michael Ronsky schemes to overthrow Catherine in a military coup and install his oafish nephew Boris as a figurehead. Countess Anna Jaschikoff is the czarina's confidante and lady-in-waiting, helping her navigate the social aspects of court life. When Catherine discards her latest lover, Variatinsky, commander of the palace guard, he responds by attempting to shoot himself, but he misses. Determined to conclude the Russian-French treaty by receiving the Marquis de Fleury, the French ambassador, Chancellor Nicolai orders that no only he and the ambassador may spend any time with the czarina. However, determined young lieutenant Alexei Chernoff, coincidentally Jaschikoff's fiancé, insists on an audience with Catherine, riding for three days and storming past palace security to speak to her.

Chernoff comes bearing news of Ronsky's nascent rebellion. It comes as no surprise to the czarina or to Chancellor Nicolai, who has already made an "arrangement" with Ronsky, but Catherine likes the patriotic and handsome lieutenant, promoting him to captain and asking him to prepare policy recommendations on foreign and domestic issues. Later, she seduces him, ensuring his promotion to general and installing him as the new commander of the palace guard. Countess Jaschikoff is infuriated and takes her anger out on Catherine, who responds by banishing her from court. Chancellor Nicolai, who has become outraged at Chernoff's reformist proposals, attempts to resign, but is compelled to stay on by Catherine, who ensures him that she is not taking Chernoff seriously as an advisor.

Elsewhere, Chernoff is being courted by Ronsky and the rebellious generals; they wish to use his position to ensure that the palace guard does not raise any physical resistance to their forces. To drive a wedge between Chernoff and Catherine, Ronsky introduces Chernoff to Variatinsky, who informs Chernoff in private of his intimate knowledge of Catherine. Chernoff attacks Variatinsky and begs Catherine to say that Variatinsky was lying, but the czarina candidly confirms his claims, describes Chernoff as a "nobody" whom she "made" prominent, and accidentally discloses that she has been discarding Chernoff's policy plans without reading them. Chernoff returns to Ronsky and pledges his support. Later that night, he dismisses the palace guard and arrests the czarina. Troops storm the palace, but they are loyal to Catherine; Chancellor Nicolai has leveraged his illicit control of Russia's finances for the allegiance of the rebels and then immediately betrayed them. The uprising is quelled.

Ronsky is made Chancellor Nicolai's servant, but a betrayed Catherine sentences Chernoff to death, a condemnation that he accepts as a traitor. Lobbying by Chancellor Nicolai and Countess Jaschikoff (who has returned from exile) convinces the czarina to pardon Chernoff. Finally, Catherine and the French ambassador conduct their long-delayed meeting. The diplomat, himself a young and handsome nobleman, greets Catherine with such obsequious flattery that the Czarina takes a romantic interest in him, and the film ends with Chancellor Nicolai leaving the two to flirt in privacy, confident that a relationship between the two will lead to the alliance for which he has long schemed.

Cast
 Tallulah Bankhead as Catherine the Great
 Charles Coburn as Chancellor Nicolai Ilyitch
 Anne Baxter as Countess Anna Jaschikoff
 William Eythe as Lieutenant/Captain/Major/Colonel/General/Private Alexei Chernoff
 Vincent Price as Marquis de Fleury, Ambassador-Plenipotentiary of France, Vicomte de Bayeux, Comte de Bayon Valez, Baron de Villau, and Keeper of the Seals
 Mischa Auer as Captain Sukov
 Sig Ruman as General Michael Nicolai Vladimirovich Ronsky
 Vladimir Sokoloff as Malakoff
 Mikhail Rasumny as Drunken General
 Donald Douglas as Variatinsky
 Grady Sutton as Boris Nikitin
 Michael Visaroff as Russian General (uncredited)

Production
Ernst Lubitsch, who directed the silent film Forbidden Paradise upon which A Royal Scandal is based, was the first director hired, but when he fell ill, he was replaced by Otto Preminger. However, Lubitsch directed the rehearsals, and he worked with Edwin Justus Mayer in the scripting process.

Reception 
In a contemporary review for The New York Times, critic Bosley Crowther called the film "an oddly dull and generally witless show" and wrote:

Notes

External links
 
 
 
 

1945 films
1940s historical films
20th Century Fox films
American historical films
American romantic drama films
American black-and-white films
1940s English-language films
Films about Catherine the Great
American films based on plays
Films directed by Ernst Lubitsch
Films directed by Otto Preminger
Remakes of American films
Sound film remakes of silent films
1940s American films